Enemy Property Act may refer to:
 Enemy Property Act, 1968 of India
 Vested Property Act (Bangladesh)